Anne Marie Helger (born 12 February 1946) is a Danish actress and performer. She has performed in theatre, films and television.

Style and work 
In Denmark, Helger is well known for her activism, political satire and engagement in numerous humanitarian projects. Helgers work for the Danish HIV-AIDS movement is among her most notable of these.

Helger attended the Aalborg Theatre school, but did not finish the education. In the 1960s she became a member of the travelling street theatre group of Solvognen (The Sun Chariot), and later in the 1970s Debatteatret (The Debate-theatre).

Helger is known for her many flamboyant dresses, make-up and jewellery, but not exclusively, as she has also performed in classical theatre plays and on television. Helger has worked closely with Danish actor and performer Peter Larsen in various events and projects.

Selected filmography 

 Strømer (Cop) (1976)
 Nyt Legetøj (1977)
 The Heritage (1978)
 Johnny Larsen (1979)
 Kniven i Hjertet (1981)
 Koks i Kulissen (1983)
 Crash (1984)
 Sidste Akt (1987)
 Himmel og Helvede (1988)
 De Frigjorte (1993)
 Viktor og Viktoria (1993)
 Cirkus Ildebrand (1995)
 Fru Eilersen og Mehmet (2006)

References

Sources 
 Kvinfo: Anne Marie Helger (1946 - ) Dansk Kvindebiografisk Leksikon

External links 
 
 helger.dk, Anne Marie Helger web page (in Danish language)

1946 births
Danish film actresses
Danish television actresses
People from Gentofte Municipality
Living people